The fourth season of Hawaii Five-O, an American television series, began September 14, 1971, and ended on March 7, 1972. It aired on CBS. The region 1 DVD was released on June 10, 2008.

Episodes

References 

1971 American television seasons
1972 American television seasons
04